Frederick Weeks (7 June 1903 – 20 February 1990) was an English cricketer. He played for Gloucestershire between 1925 and 1928.

References

External links

1903 births
1990 deaths
English cricketers
Gloucestershire cricketers
Cricketers from Bristol